Cannabis in Nepal has been illegal since 1976, but the country has a long history of use of cannabis for Ayurvedic medicine, intoxicant and as a holy offering for Hindu god Shiva and continues to produce cannabis illicitly.

History

Nepal has used psychoactive cannabis for centuries, and as early as the 1700s Nepalese charas was recognized as the best available. Nepal was a gateway destination for every Ganja lover. There used to be a street known as Freak Street where Marijuana products were sold openly by licensed agents. The popular street is still in front of Basantapur Durbar today known as the hippie street but eventually has lost its charm now. Everyone was benefited including the Government, farmers and the businessmen from the cultivation, sales, and production of Marijuana.

In the early 1800s, commentator Francis Buchanan-Hamilton noted:

The Hippie Trail
In the 1960s, the Hippie Trail began to route young Western adventurers through Nepal. The stable traditional cannabis economy was rocked by the influx of demand, and the heavy usage by visitors normalized and made cannabis consumption trendy locally. The increased demand and linkage to outside markets led to an increase in hashish production, and smuggling routes were established through India and the wider world.

Prohibition
In 1973, Nepal canceled the licenses of all cannabis shops, dealers, and farmers, under pressure from the United States and the international community. However, personal cultivation and use were unaffected, and cannabis commerce continued illicitly.  The loss of $100,000 in government revenues caused disruption, and later in the 1970s, attempts were made at crop substitution.

Law
Nepal enacts Narcotic Drugs (Control) Act, 2033 (1976) on 22 September 1976 prohibiting the cultivation, production, preparation, purchasing, selling, distributing, exporting or importing, conduct any trafficking, store, or consume cannabis. The Act classifies cannabis as narcotic drugs that includes (1) Any plant of cannabis/ marijuana genus including hemp and siddha and also includes the leaves and flowers thereof. (2) Natural resin, gum, and sap obtained from ... cannabis/ marijuana plants, and, (3) Any substance containing any of the extract, substance, essence, mixture, and beverage containing any of the substances mentioned above. 
However, the prohibition of the Act is not to be applied to the Government of Nepal or	any institution working under the full and complete supervision and control of the Government of Nepal after obtaining a special license for cultivating, preparation, producing, manufacturing, exporting, or importing narcotic drugs for the purposes of medicine or scientific research or from selling narcotic drugs to any person on the recommendation of a recognized medical practitioner.
The Government of Nepal may frame Rules regulating the production of hashish (chares) from wild cannabis/marijuana plants growing in the western hilly region of Nepal and the collection, storage, sale, and purchase of such hashish (chares) for a specified period. The government of Nepal may, if it deems necessary, for cannabis/
marijuana, for the purpose of preparing medicine, make available in the required quantity of cannabis/ marijuana out of the cannabis confiscated or seized under the Act to any agency which is engaged in the production of medicine.

Cultivation
Cannabis can be found in the wild in all hilly areas of Nepal. There has been some report of illegal cultivation in the country.

Usage

Pickles
In Nepal, cannabis seeds are also used in making pickles "bhang ko achar". The dried seeds are ground and then mixed with aalo (potato). This is common in a hilly area like Kathmandu, Pokhara, Surkhet  of Nepal.

Medicine
It is used in the Ayurvedic medicine by Singha Durbar Vaidyakhana.

Festival
Cannabis is considered as the gift of Lord Shiva, and is considered as holy offering in the festival of Mahashivaratri. On the day of Mahashivaratri, officials historically tolerated cannabis use, but starting around 2018, police said they would arrest festival observers found smoking in public places during shivaratri.

Legalization movement
Member of Parliament from the Communist Party, Birodh Khatiwada, and 47 other party lawmakers filed a motion in parliament in January 2020 calling for the legalization of Cannabis.
 Another legalization bill, supported by the national health minister, was introduced in 2021.

See also
Alcohol in Nepal

References

Nepal
Crime in Nepal
Politics of Nepal